Slobodan Vuk (born 15 September 1989) is a Slovenian football forward who plays for NK Domžale.

Personal life
His older brother, Goran Vuk, is also a professional footballer.

References

External links
PrvaLiga profile 

1989 births
Living people
People from Jajce
Slovenian footballers
Association football forwards
NK Domžale players
Slovenian PrvaLiga players
Slovenian expatriate footballers
Expatriate footballers in Norway
Slovenian expatriate sportspeople in Norway
Tromsø IL players
Eliteserien players